Aicardi syndrome is a protein that in humans is encoded by the AIC gene.

References 

Genes on human chromosome X